Thryptomene calycina, commonly known as Grampians thryptomene, is a species of flowering plant in the family Myrtaceae and is endemic to Victoria in Australia. It is an erect or spreading shrub with oblong, elliptic or egg-shaped leaves with the narrower end toward the base, and white flowers with five stamens.

Description
Flowering mostly occurs from July to November.

Taxonomy
This species was first formally described in 1838 by John Lindley who gave it the name Baeckea calycina in Thomas Mitchell's book, Three Expeditions into the interior of Eastern Australia . In 1924, Otto Stapf changed the name to Thryptomene calycina in The Botanical Magazine.

Distribution and habitat
Grampians thryptomene mostly grows in sandy soil and is found in heath and heathy woodland in the Grampians, although it is naturalised in a suburb of Melbourne and there is an old record from South Australia.

Conservation status
This thryptomene is listed as "rare in Victoria" on the Department of Sustainability and Environment's Advisory List of Rare Or Threatened Plants In Victoria.

Use in horticultureThryptomene calycina'' is propagated from cuttings and is sometimes available in commercial nurseries. It requires light soil and full sun or part shade.

References

calycina
Flora of Victoria (Australia)
Plants described in 1838
Taxa named by John Lindley